Stark Spirits Distillery is an artisan distillery in Pasadena, California, that produces a range of alcoholic beverages under the direction of Head Distiller Greg Stark. The microdistillery is owned by husband and wife, Greg Stark and Karen Robinson-Stark. It is Pasadena's first microdistillery. Stark Spirits is a Certified Craft Distillery, certified by the American Distilling Institute. The Pasadena micro-distillery is known for producing hand crafted small batches of whiskey, rum, gin, and brandy.

History
Distillery planning started in late 2011. In 2012, the location was identified near the Craftsman Brewing Co. TTB approved and issued its license November 21, 2013. The CA ABC approved and issued its license December 21, 2013.

Stark Spirits facility is less than 1200 square feet and is essentially a nano-distillery because of the annual production capacity. At full production capacity, including the bottling of barrel-aged rum and whiskey, the distillery can manufacture fewer than 5000 cases annually.

Greg Stark is the head distiller and Karen Robinson is the assistant distiller. Greg started his distilling business after many years of making home-brewed wine and beer.

Stark Spirits received recognition as a certified craft distillery because it meets the criteria of being owned by the distiller, manufactures and bottles all its products, and produces less than 50,000 cases a year.

Awards
2015 Bronze Medal Packaging - ADI
2016 Best of Category & Silver Medal - Overproof Rum - California Silver 151 Rum
2016 Silver Medal - Sunshine Orange Brandy
2016 Bronze Medal - Peated Single Malt Whiskey
2016 Bronze Medal - California Gold Rum

Products
Current Spirits
 Sunshine Orange Brandy
 California Silver Rum
 California Silver 151 Rum
 California Gold Rum
 California Single American whiskey
 Peated Single Malt Whiskey
 Skyline Gin
 Traditional Aquavit

Future spirits
 Rye Whiskey

References

External links
 starkspirits.com - official site
 California Artisan Distillers Guild
 American Distilling Institute  (ADI)

Whiskies of the United States
American rums
Rums of the Pacific Rim
Gins
Brandies
American companies established in 2013
Cuisine of the Western United States
Distilleries in California
Food and drink companies established in 2013